This article is about the particular significance of the year 2002 to Wales and its people.

Incumbents

First Minister – Rhodri Morgan
Secretary of State for Wales
Paul Murphy (until 24 October)
Peter Hain
Archbishop of Wales – Rowan Williams, Bishop of Monmouth (translated)
Archdruid of the National Eisteddfod of Wales
Meirion Evans (outgoing)
Robyn Llŷn (incoming)

Events
In the BBC's 100 Greatest Britons poll, those with a Welsh connection who finished in the top 100 were:
Diana, Princess of Wales - 3
Elizabeth I of England - 7
Owain Glyndŵr - 23
Henry VIII of England - 40
Aneurin Bevan - 45
Henry V of England - 72
Richard Burton - 96
14 February – at the Ogmore by-election, the Labour Party candidate Huw Irranca-Davies holds the seat held by Sir Ray Powell until his death
13 March - The ferry  is introduced on the Fishguard–Rosslare route.
April - Welsh Assembly Government concessionary travel scheme (‘Cerdyn Cymru’) entitles over-60s and registered disabled people to uniform free off-peak travel on all stage carriage bus services.
May - H & Claire release their debut single.
May 25 - Jessica Garlick represents the UK in the Eurovision Song Contest held in Estonia.
June
Archaeologists discover the Newport ship.
DNA from the exhumed body of Joe Kappen proves beyond reasonable doubt that he was responsible for the murders of three teenage girls in 1973.
June 18 - Cowbridge businessman Peter Shaw is kidnapped while working in Tbilisi, Georgia. He is held in brutal conditions until he escapes in November.
June 28 - David Morris receives four life sentences for the Clydach murders of June 1999.  Despite his having been a suspect days after the murder was committed, it had taken police 21 months to arrest and charge him.
July
Research reveals that Wales has the highest figures for company failures of any region of the UK.
Ebbw Vale Steelworks shut down.
August - "Barney" saves his owners' lives by warning them of a fire at their home in Wrexham.
August 5 - Rowan Williams is admitted to the Gorsedd of bards.
October - Archaeological excavations on a Bronze Age site recover the Banc Ty'nddôl sun-disc, one of the earliest gold objects found in Wales.
October 24 - Paul Murphy is appointed Secretary of State for Northern Ireland.

Arts and literature 
Teenage actor Gethin Rhys Williams is killed in an accident in Spain.
Connie Fisher wins the Wilbert Lloyd Roberts Scholarship in the National Eisteddfod "Songs from the Shows" competition.
Menna Elfyn is named Poet Laureate for the Children of Wales.

Awards 
National Eisteddfod of Wales: Chair - Myrddin ap Dafydd
National Eisteddfod of Wales: Crown - Aled Jones Lewis
National Eisteddfod of Wales: Prose Medal -  O! Tyn y Gorchudd - Hunangofiant Rebecca Jones by Angharad Price
Wales Book of the Year:
English language: Stevie Davies, The Element of Water
Welsh language:
Gwobr Goffa Daniel Owen - Eurig Wyn
John Tripp Prize for Spoken Poetry - Cliff Forshaw

New books

English language 
Richard J. Evans - Telling Lies About Hitler
Ken Follett - Hornet Flight
Steve Jones - The Descent of Men
Jo Mazelis - Diving Girls
Jan Morris - A Writer's House in Wales
Steve Strange - Blitzed! The Autobiography of Steve Strange
Rachel Trezise - In and Out of the Goldfish Bowl
Rowan Williams - Arius - Heresy and Tradition

Welsh language 
Grahame Davies - Cadwyni Rhyddid
Angharad Price - O! Tyn y Gorchudd
Eirug Wyn - Bitsh

Drama 
Dic Edwards - Franco's Bastard

Film
Christian Bale stars in Laurel Canyon.
Anthony Hopkins plays Hannibal Lecter for the third time, in Red Dragon.

Welsh-language films 
Gwyfyn.
Oedd yr Addewid

Music 
3SL - "Take it Easy" (single)
Carreg Lafar - Profiad (album)
Feeder - Comfort In Sound (album)
Mclusky - Mclusky Do Dallas
Bonnie Tyler - Heart & Soul/Heart Strings (album)

Broadcasting

English-language television
Cable TV (chat show with Stuart Cable)

Welsh-language television
Gwyfyn

Sport

BBC Wales Sports Personality of the Year
Mark Hughes

2002 Commonwealth Games
25 July to 4 August – At the Commonwealth Games in Manchester, the Wales team wins a total of 31 medals: 6 gold, 13 silver and 12 bronze.

Cycling
Andrew Windsor wins the Welsh National Road Race Championships.

Football
John Fashanu becomes Chairman of Barry Town.
Barry Town are Welsh Cup winners after beating Bangor City 4–1, and win a sixth League of Wales title.
Winners of the three divisions in the Welsh Football League are: Ton Pentre (Division 1), Garden Village (Division 2) & Newport YMCA (Division 3).
Welshpool Town are champions of the Cymru Alliance.

Horse racing
27 December – The Welsh National is won by Mini Sensation, ridden by Tony Dobbin.

Rugby union
December – Brynmawr RFC and Abertillery RFC withdraw from the Principality Cup, after the Welsh Rugby Union makes an error during the live radio draw for the fifth round.

Snooker
27 January – Paul Hunter wins the Welsh Open tournament in Cardiff.
3 March – Mark Williams wins the China Open tournament in Shanghai.
15 December – Mark Williams wins his second UK Championship title.

Births
23 February - Emilia Jones, actress, daughter of Aled Jones
15 September - Medi Harris, swimmer
17 December - Matt Richards, Olympic swimmer (in Worcester)
22 December - Emma Finucane, cyclist

Deaths
2 January 
Ian Grist, politician, 63
Arthur Joseph, cricketer, 82
7 January - Jon Lee, rock musician, 33
12 January - Moss Evans, trade union leader, 76
3 February - Edward Thomas Chapman, Victoria Cross recipient, 82
22 February - David James, cricketer, 80
March - Geoff Charles, photojournalist, 93
2 March - Mary Grant Price, costume designer, 85
3 March - Bill Hopkin, rugby player, 87
6 March - David Jenkins, Librarian of the National Library of Wales 1969–79, 89
7 May - Sir Ewart Jones, organic chemist and academic administrator, 91 
26 September - Willie Davies, Wales international rugby union and league player, 86
6 October - Nick Whitehead, athlete, 69
November - Ernie Jones, footballer, 81/82
3 November - Sir John Habakkuk, economic historian, 87 
20 November - George Guest, organist and choirmaster of St John's College, Cambridge, 78
December - Brian Morgan Edwards, businessman, 68
10 December - Steve Llewellyn, rugby league player, 78
24 December - Jake Thackray, singer-songwriter, 64 
31 December - Billy Morris, footballer, 84

See also
List of Statutory Instruments of the Welsh Assembly, 2002
2002 in Northern Ireland

References

 
Wales
2000s in Wales